Håvard Nielsen (born 15 July 1993) is a Norwegian professional footballer who plays as a forward for 2. Bundesliga club Hannover 96. He represented the Norway national team.

Club career
Born in the Norwegian capital, Oslo, Nielsen grew up in the outer-city neighborhood of Oppsal. He began his career with the local club Oppsal IF, but signed for Vålerenga in 2007, when he was 14 years old.

On 5 October 2009, he made his debut in the Norwegian Premier League against Viking as the youngest ever Vålerenga player. In January 2011, he signed a three-year professional contract with Vålerenga.

At the age of 18, Nielsen was already an experienced player and on 11 July 2012, he scored his first hat-trick for Vålerenga in the match against Odd Grenland.

In July 2012, he signed a deal with Red Bull Salzburg. In January 2014, he went on loan to the German Bundesliga side Eintracht Braunschweig. On 26 January 2014 he made his debut in the German first tier, in a game against Werder Bremen. The loan deal ended in June 2015 when he returned to Salzburg.

In winter 2015 Nielsen moved to SC Freiburg.

In July 2017, after 1.5 seasons at Freiburg, Nielsen signed a three-year contract with 2. Bundesliga side Fortuna Düsseldorf.

He was loaned to MSV Duisburg on 8 January 2019.

On 26 July 2019, Nielsen joined 2. Bundesliga side Greuther Fürth, signing a two-year contract.

Ahead of the 2022–23 season, Nielsen joined 2. Bundesliga club Hannover 96 on a two-year contract.

International career
Nielsen has played for a national team above his age since he was 16. He played all matches during the 2011 European Under-19 Championship qualification and scored one goal, when Norway advanced to the elite qualification.

Nielsen made his debut for the senior Norwegian national team in 2012 as a teenager and since then he has played 11 times for the Norway national team and he is now a regular for Norway. He scored his first international goal for Norway at only 19 years of age, in November 2012, against Hungary in a friendly match. He scored his second goal for Norway in October 2014, in a European Championship qualifier against Bulgaria.

Career statistics

Club

International
Scores and results list Norway's goal tally first, score column indicates score after each Nielsen goal.

References

External links

Profile at VIF-Fotball.no

Living people
1993 births
Footballers from Oslo
Association football forwards
Norwegian footballers
Norway international footballers
Norway under-21 international footballers
Norway youth international footballers
Vålerenga Fotball players
FC Red Bull Salzburg players
Eintracht Braunschweig players
SC Freiburg players
Fortuna Düsseldorf players
MSV Duisburg players
SpVgg Greuther Fürth players
Hannover 96 players
Eliteserien players
Austrian Football Bundesliga players
Bundesliga players
2. Bundesliga players
Norwegian expatriate footballers
Expatriate footballers in Austria
Expatriate footballers in Germany
Norwegian expatriate sportspeople in Austria
Norwegian expatriate sportspeople in Germany